The Fenton Ferry is a cable ferry in the Canadian province of Saskatchewan. The ferry crosses the South Saskatchewan River, linking Highway 25 with Highway 3 via a grid road north of Fenton.

The six-car ferry is operated by the Saskatchewan Ministry of Highways and Infrastructure.  The ferry is free of tolls and operates between 7:00 am and midnight, during the ice-free season. 

The ferry carries more than 7500 vehicles each year.

See also 
List of crossings of the South Saskatchewan River

References 

Birch Hills No. 460, Saskatchewan
Cable ferries in Canada
Ferries of Saskatchewan
Prince Albert No. 461, Saskatchewan
Division No. 15, Saskatchewan